The men's 200 metre backstroke event at the 1996 Summer Olympics took place on 26 July at the Georgia Tech Campus Recreation Center in Atlanta, United States. There were 39 competitors from 33 nations. Each nation had been limited to two swimmers in the event since 1984. The event was won by Brad Bridgewater of the United States, with his countryman Tripp Schwenk taking silver. It was the first time since 1980 that one nation had two swimmers on the podium in the event (Hungary took gold and silver then). Bridgewater's victory was the United States' first in the event since 1984 and fourth overall. Italy earned its second consecutive bronze medal in the men's 200 metre backstroke, with Emanuele Merisi taking the honours this time.

Background

This was the 10th appearance of the 200 metre backstroke event. It was first held in 1900. The event did not return until 1964; since then, it has been on the programme at every Summer Games. From 1904 to 1960, a men's 100 metre backstroke was held instead. In 1964, only the 200 metres was held. Beginning in 1968 and ever since, both the 100 and 200 metre versions have been held.

Four of the 8 finalists from the 1992 Games returned: gold medalist Martín López-Zubero of Spain, silver medalist Vladimir Selkov of the Unified Team (now competing for Russia), fourth-place finisher Hajime Itoi of Japan, and fifth-place finisher Tripp Schwenk of the United States. Seventh-place finisher Tamás Deutsch of Hungary was entered but did not start. The medalists at the 1994 World Aquatics Championships had been Selkov, López-Zubero (also the 1991 World Champion), and Royce Sharp of the United States. Sharp did not compete in Atlanta; the American team consisted of Schwenk and Brad Bridgewater. López-Zubero's 1991 world record still stood. He had come out of retirement to try to defend his title, but Selkov was favoured in Atlanta. Emanuele Merisi of Italy had the best time of 1996 so far and was also a strong contender.

Barbados, Chile, Croatia, the Czech Republic, Lithuania, Moldova, Russia, Slovakia, and Thailand each made their debut in the event. Australia and Great Britain each made their ninth appearance, tied for most among nations to that point.

Competition format

The competition used a two-round (heats and final) format. The advancement rule followed the format introduced in 1952. A swimmer's place in the heat was not used to determine advancement; instead, the fastest times from across all heats in a round were used. A "consolation final" had been added in 1984. There were 6 heats of up to 8 swimmers each. The top 8 swimmers advanced to the final. The next 8 (9th through 16th) competed in a consolation final. Swim-offs were used as necessary to break ties.

This swimming event used backstroke. Because an Olympic-size swimming pool is 50 metres long, this race consisted of four lengths of the pool.

Records

Prior to this competition, the existing world and Olympic records were as follows.

No world or Olympic records were set during the competition, with the gold medal time 0.07 seconds slower than the Olympic record.

Schedule

All times are Eastern Daylight Time (UTC-4)

Results

Heats

The eight fastest swimmers advanced to final A, while the next eight went to final B.

Finals

The finals were held on the same day as the heats, 26 July.

Final B

Final A

Bridgewater took the lead at the first turn, with Schwenk behind him. Both tired late, but Merisi was not quite able to catch either.

References

External links
 Official Report
 USA Swimming

Swimming at the 1996 Summer Olympics
200 metre backstroke at the Olympics
Men's events at the 1996 Summer Olympics